Andrea Gaudenzi and Diego Nargiso were the defending champions, but did not participate this year.

Fernando Meligeni and Jaime Oncins won in the final 6–2, 6–3, against Massimo Ardinghi and Vincenzo Santopadre.

Seeds

Draw

Finals

References

1999 ATP Tour
1999 Grand Prix Hassan II